Apateta cryphia is a species of moth of the family Tortricidae. It is found in Australia.

References

Moths described in 1926
Tortricinae
Moths of Australia